Aiyawatt 'Top' Srivaddhanaprabha, (born Aiyawatt Raksriaksorn, 26 July 1985) is a Thai businessman, the CEO and the Chairman of King Power, and the chairman of Leicester City F.C. and OH Leuven. On Forbes' 2020 World’s Billionaires List he was one of the five youngest billionaires in Asia.

Education
Aiyawatt was educated at Saint Gabriel's College, one of the Montfort Brothers of St. Gabriel colleges, and earned a bachelor of business administration degree from the Bangkok University International Program.

Career
Aiyawatt Srivaddhanaprabha is the CEO and vice-chairman of King Power, which was owned by his late father Vichai Srivaddhanaprabha. He has also had senior executive and administrative capacities at numerous associated companies.

He is the chairman of Premier League football club Leicester City, of which his late father had been the owner and chairman from 2010 to his death in 2018. After the death of his father he became the chairman.

For his work in business and contribution to the community in the City of Leicester, he was awarded an honorary doctorate by De Montfort University in 2014.

Personal life
Srivaddhanaprabha is a Buddhist, and was ordained as a monk at the Thepsirin Buddhist Temple in Bangkok for a month in 2015.

Aiyawatt's grandfather, Wiwat Raksriaksorn (Chinese name: 徐利明) traces his roots at Zhao'an, Fujian, China. Aiyawat's father Vichai Srivaddhanaprabha was the founder of King Power. He has three elder siblings, brother Apichet and sisters Voramas and Aroonroong.

On 27 October 2018, his father died in a helicopter crash outside the King Power Stadium following Leicester City's home match against West Ham United. Aiyawatt had not attended the match. The next day, he flew to Leicester to pay tribute to his father.

References

Aiyawatt Srivaddhanaprabha
Living people
Leicester City F.C. directors and chairmen
Aiyawatt Srivaddhanaprabha
Aiyawatt Srivaddhanaprabha
Southeast Asian Games medalists in polo
Aiyawatt Srivaddhanaprabha
Aiyawatt Srivaddhanaprabha
Aiyawatt Srivaddhanaprabha
Competitors at the 2017 Southeast Asian Games
1985 births
Aiyawatt Srivaddhanaprabha
Oud-Heverlee Leuven directors and chairmen